Melissa Mueller (born November 16, 1972, in Waukesha, Wisconsin) is an American pole vaulter.

She finished fifth at the 1999 World Indoor Championships and won the gold medal at the 2003 Pan American Games in Santo Domingo. She also competed at the 2000 Summer Olympics.

Her personal best jump is 4.60 metres, achieved in July 2003 at an All-comers track meet in Atascadero, California.
She now lives in Georgia.

References
 

1972 births
Living people
American female pole vaulters
Athletes (track and field) at the 2000 Summer Olympics
Athletes (track and field) at the 2003 Pan American Games
Olympic track and field athletes of the United States
Sportspeople from Waukesha, Wisconsin
Track and field athletes from Wisconsin
Pan American Games gold medalists for the United States
Pan American Games medalists in athletics (track and field)
Medalists at the 2003 Pan American Games